Puketahā is a proposed wildlife sanctuary to be established in a water catchment reserve in Wainuiomata, New Zealand.

The forecast cost is NZ$42 million. A study commissioned by Wellington Regional Council and conducted by Jim Lynch, the founder of Zealandia, reported in 2022 that establishing the sanctuary was "technically and practically feasible".

The site of the proposed sanctuary is the Wainuiomata water catchment area containing virgin forest that is rare in New Zealand.  It would be 15 times as large as the Zealandia sanctuary. Native trees inside the proposed sanctuary include  tawa, hīnau, rātā, mataī, miro, and rimu. Of these, rimu is particularly abundant, covering 85% of the sanctuary.  The large number of rimu could make it feasible to translocate critically endangered kākāpō birds to the sanctuary, because rimu is important to their breeding success. Other threatened birds such as rowi kiwi and hihi could also be translocated to the sanctuary.

References

External links
 RNZ interview with Jim Lynch about Puketahā - April 2022

Protected areas of the Wellington Region
Wildlife sanctuaries of New Zealand
Lower Hutt